Edward Carfagno (November 28, 1907 – December 28, 1996) was an art director who established himself in the 1950s with his Oscar-winning work on such films as Vincente Minnelli's The Bad and the Beautiful (1952), Joseph Mankiewicz's Julius Caesar (1953) and William Wyler's Ben-Hur (1959)
. Carfagno went on to work consistently on a variety of films, including five collaborations with Clint Eastwood including Tightrope (1984) and Heartbreak Ridge (1987).

Carfagno began working at MGM in 1933, and was also a member of the US's 1940 Olympic fencing team.

See also
 Art Directors Guild Hall of Fame

References

External links

American art directors
Best Art Direction Academy Award winners
American male fencers
1907 births
1996 deaths
University of Southern California alumni
American production designers